Prasad Studios & Prasad Film Labs are motion picture post-production studios headquartered in Chennai, India, founded by Prasad Group in 1956. The production house has produced over 150 movies in Telugu, Tamil, Kannada, Malayalam and Hindi.

This group is one of the largest chain of post production facilities in India with a total of 12 delivery units located in all the major film production centers of India such as Mumbai, Hyderabad, Chennai, Bangalore, Thiruvananthapuram, Bhubaneswar, Kolkata and has an overseas presence in Singapore, Dubai and United States.

It has also won the Kerala State Film Award for Best Processing Lab 9 times over the last 3 decades.

History
Headed by Ramesh Prasad, son of late L.V. Prasad and Sai Prasad, grandson of late L.V. Prasad.  The group owns one of the major equipment and film facilities in India for feature film and advertising post production. Prasad Group works in feature films, film and video restoration and advertising commercial production.

Prasad Group
Prasad Productions Pvt Ltd
Prasad Art Pictures
Prasad Film Labs
Prasad EFX -  Largest digital restoration facilities in the world
Prasad Video Digital 
L. V. Prasad Film and TV Academy
Prasads Multiplex / Mall, Prasads IMAX
Prasad Panavision
Prasad Corp USA.
Prasad Digital Intermediate
DCE Dubai 
DCE Singapore
DFT - Digital Film Technology GmbH - manufacturers of the Scanity real time motion picture film scanner.
L.V. Prasad Film & TV Academy

Locations
India:
 Chennai, Tamilnadu (Headquarter)
 Mumbai, Maharastra
 Hyderabad, Telangana
 Bangalore, Karnataka
 Trivandrum, Kerala
 Bhubaneswar, Odisha
 Kolkata, West Bengal
 New Delhi (sales office)

United States:
 Hollywood, California (sales office)
 Burbank, California(sales office)

Germany:
 Darmstadt

Japan:
 Tokyo

UK:
 London

Productions
Arasu Vidumurai (2014)

See also
L. V. Prasad Eye Institute

References

External links
Official website - Prasad Group
Official website - EFX Magic
Official website - Prasad Film Laboratories
Official website - Prasad Video Digital
Official website - L.V.Prasad Film & TV Academy
Official website - Prasads IMAX, Multiplex and Mall
Official website - L.V.Prasad
Imdb

Indian film studios
Film production companies based in Hyderabad, India
Recording studios in India
Entertainment companies established in 1965
Indian companies established in 1965
1965 establishments in Andhra Pradesh